Gardi is a village situated in Sangli district, Khanapur (Vita) taluka, Pune division of Maharashtra, India.
It falls under desh or Paschim Maharashtra region. Gardi village is a birthplace of Anilbhau Babar (MLA Maharashtra).

Geography 
Nearby cities : Vita, Mahuli, Tasgaon, Uran Islampur

Demographics 
Language spoken : Marathi

Pin code : 415311

References 

Villages in Sangli district